Emilian-Romagnol is a linguistic continuum that is part of the Gallo-Romance languages spoken in the northern Italian region of Emilia-Romagna. It is divided into two main varieties: Emilian and Romagnol.

While first registered under a single code in ISO standard 639-3, in 2009 this was retired in favour of two distinct codes for the two varieties, due to the cultural and literary split between the two parts of the region, making Emilian and Romagnol distinct ethnolinguistic entities. Since 2015, Emilian and Romagnol are considered, with separated entries, definitely endangered languages according to the UNESCO Atlas of the World's Languages in Danger.

Description

As part of the Gallo-Italic languages, Emilian-Romagnol is most closely related to the Lombard, Piedmontese and Ligurian languages, all of which are spoken in neighboring regions.

Among other Gallo-Italic languages, Emilian-Romagnol is characterized by systematic raising and diphthongization of Latin stressed vowels in open syllables, as well as widespread syncope of unstressed vowels other than /a/ and use of vowel gradation in the formation of plurals and certain verb tenses.

Dialects
 Emilian
 Carrarese dialect
 Lunigianese dialect
 Tortonese dialect
 Pavese-Vogherese dialect, Oltrepò dialect
 Placentine dialect, Bobbiese dialect
 Modenese dialect, Carpesan dialect, Mirandolese dialect, Frignanese dialect 
 Reggio dialect, Guastallese dialect
 Parmesan dialect
 Casalmaggiore-Viadana dialect
 Mantuan dialect
 Lower Mantuan dialect
 Bolognese dialect
 Bologna city dialect
 Mid-mountains dialects
 Upper mountains dialects
 Northern plains dialects
 Eastern plains dialects
 Western plains dialects
 Ferrara dialect
Comacchio dialect

 Romagnol
 Ravenna dialect
 Forlì dialect
 Cesena dialect
 Rimini dialect
 Sammarinese dialect 
north-eastern (Serravallian)
south-western
south-eastern
 Gallo-Picene: classification is disputed. While generally considered close to Romagnol, being part of the Gallo-Italic group, some have suggested a third component of Emilian-Romagnol continuum
 Urbinate dialect
 Montefeltrin dialect
 Pesarese dialect
 Fanese dialect
 Senigallia dialect
 Conero Gallo-Italic dialects
 Upper Tiber transitional dialects

Controversy
Native speakers reject the suggestion to consider Emilian-Romagnol as one language, which is perceived as an artifice imposed top-down by academics, and much rather prefer identify as speakers of distinct Emilian or Romagnol languages (especially in Romagna), or directly of the local variants of the two.

See also

 Languages of Italy

References

 
Gallo-Italic languages
Languages of Italy
Languages of Emilia-Romagna
Languages of Lombardy
Languages of Liguria
Languages of le Marche
Languages of San Marino